"I Hate U, I Love U" (stylized in all lowercase) is a song by American singer and rapper Gnash featuring American singer Olivia O'Brien. It was released on July 26, 2015, as the first single from Gnash's third extended play, Us (2016). The song peaked at number ten on the Billboard Hot 100. Outside of the United States, "I Hate U, I Love U" topped the charts in Australia, a first for both Gnash and O'Brien, and peaked within the top ten of the charts in Austria, Belgium, Finland, Norway, and the United Kingdom.

On March 20, 2016, O'Brien released her solo version of the song titled "Hate U Love U".

The song was included on Gnash's debut studio album, We, which was released on January 11, 2019.

Background and release
Gnash enlisted San Francisco singer-songwriter Olivia O'Brien with the help of JB, who originally wrote the song, to provide the vocals for the track. O'Brien had already worked with Gnash, having covered his song "Disposable". Gnash originally released the song on July 26, 2015, and it was later re-released on February 17, 2016, becoming the lead single of Gnash's extended play, Us (2016).

Composition
The song is written in the key of F-sharp minor with a tempo of 92 beats per minute. Musically, "I Hate U, I Love U " is a Midtempo Pop song backed by a Piano, with elements of snap and Alt-R&B.  "I Hate U, I Love U" starts off with a simple melody played on the piano, as O'Brien starts to sing the first stanza and chorus, the latter of which introduces a Hi-hat drum that plays throughout the rest of the song. The second stanza is then sung by Gnash, as well as the third verse which is sing-rapped. The third chorus is sung by both artists. The first half of the bridge is sung by O'Brien and Gnash joins in for the second half. The song ends with a piano solo, as O'Brien sings the final chorus. It has a duration of four minutes and eleven seconds.

Music video
The music video for "I Hate U, I Love U" premiered on March 7, 2016. The music was released on Gnash’s official YouTube Channel and has gained more than 715 Million views as of February 2023.

Cover versions 
In September 2017, Muslim Nasheed artist Siedd released a cover version of 'I Hate U, I Love U' on YouTube. The song which has over 3 million views on YouTube features a capella arrangements with rewritten lyrics to reflect spiritual themes.

Critical reception
Time was negative towards "I Hate U, I Love U" labeling it as one of the worst songs of 2016 and writing, "Forget The Chainsmokers and Halsey's chart-conquering smash 'Closer'—the most depressingly zeitgeist-defining song of 2016 is gnash's piano ballad 'i hate u, i love u,' with singer-songwriter Olivia O'Brien, which inexplicably rose to the Top 10 of the Hot 100 this year. The singsongy melody is obnoxious as an ice cream truck jingle, while the lifeless production drains it of any energy."

In 2017, the song was nominated for a Radio Disney Music Award for Best Breakup Song.

Charts

Weekly charts

Year-end charts

Certifications

Olivia O'Brien solo version

On March 20, 2016, O'Brien released her solo version of the song titled "Hate U Love U".

Charts

Certifications

References

2010s ballads
2016 singles
2016 songs
Gnash (musician) songs
Atlantic Records singles
Island Records singles
Number-one singles in Australia
Number-one singles in Belgium
Number-one singles in Israel
Olivia O'Brien songs
Pop ballads
Songs written by Olivia O'Brien
Songs written by Gnash (musician)